Beverwijk is a municipality and a city in the Netherlands, in the province of North Holland. A railway tunnel and two motorway tunnels cross the canal between Beverwijk and the nearby city of Haarlem on the south side of the canal. 

Around 1640, a town called Beverwyck was founded in the Dutch colony of New Netherland. That town's modern name is Albany, New York.

Population centres 
The municipality of Beverwijk consists of two cores, Beverwijk proper and Wijk aan Zee,  to the west, right on the coast.

History

The name Beverwijk comes from Bedevaartswijk, meaning "pilgrimage neighbourhood". The town formed at the Saint Agatha Church which was a pilgrimage location in the Middle Ages. Allegedly Agatha of Sicily appeared there in the 9th century to a virgin from Velsen who was fleeing from the Count of Kennemerland.

In 1276, Beverwijk was granted market rights by Floris V, and in 1298 it was granted city rights by John I, both Counts of Holland.

During the 17th century, wealthy merchants from Amsterdam built their estates, such as Huize Akerendam, Huize Westerhout, and Huize Scheijbeeck, in the scenic dunes surrounding Beverwijk.

Prior to the reclamation of the IJ Bay, the narrowest point in the North Holland peninsula was at Beverwijk. Therefore, a defensive line was built there in 1800 following the Battle of Castricum in 1799.

In 1944, during the Second World War, the Germans conducted a house-to-house raid in Beverwijk and Velsen-Noord, seizing nearly 500 persons as hostages to force the murderers of three collaborators to surrender themselves. In all, 63 of them never returned.

Around 1977, the first furniture stores opened along the Parallel Road, forming the first "furniture boulevard" in the Netherlands. By 1981, 10 businesses had been established there. South of the furniture boulevard, the Bazaar was introduced in 1980.

On March 23, 1997, Beverwijk was the location of a clash of two football firms. Supporters of the Dutch football team AFC Ajax met with Feyenoord supporters in what has come to be known as the "Battle of Beverwijk". During this incident, one Ajax supporter was beaten to death.

Since 1997, Special Needs Judo Foundation has organised its annual OBG (Open Beverwijk G-judo) tournament in Sporthal De Walvis, featuring over 1000 special needs judoka from all over the world. The tournament takes place every year in April.

Local government 
The municipal council of Beverwijk consists of 27 seats, which are divided as follows:

Notable residents 

 Gerard van Velsen (died 1296) Lord of Beverwijk, Noordwijk, and Velsen
 Richard Aertsz (1482–1577) a Dutch Renaissance painter of historical allegories
 Jan Cornelisz Vermeyen (1500-1559) a Dutch Northern Renaissance painter
 Thomas Wijck (1616-1677) a Dutch painter of port views and genre paintings
 Rochus van Veen (1630–1693) was a Dutch Golden Age painter
 Isaac Johannes Lamotius (1646–1718) Governor of Mauritius 1677 to 1692 and an ichthyologist 
 Wil Velders-Vlasblom (1930-2019) a politician and woman's rights activist, Mayor of Beverwijk 1986 to 1995
 Albert Boer (1935–2002) the author of Kamp Schoorl
 Henk Tijms (born 1944) a Dutch mathematician and academic
 Jan Baas (born 1950) a Dutch politician, alderman of Beverwijk 1990 to 1996
 Peter Pontiac (1951–2015) a Dutch cartoonist, comics artist and illustrator
 Peter de Wit (born 1958) a Dutch comics artist and cartoonist
 Astrid Joosten (born 1958) a Dutch TV personality and presenter
 Ilse Huizinga (born 1966) a Dutch jazz singer
 Willem de Rooij (born 1969) mixed media artist
 Kim-Lian van der Meij (born 1980) a musical actress, presenter and singer-songwriter

Sport 
 Cor Tabak (1907–2001) a male weightlifter who competed at the 1928 Summer Olympics
 Ab Geldermans (born 1935) a former professional road bicycle racer and directeur sportif 
 Ans Dekker (born 1955) a former artistic gymnast, competed at the 1972 and 1976 Summer Olympics 
 Wouly de Bie (born 1958) a former water polo goalkeeper, participated in two Summer Olympics 
 Michel Doesburg (born 1968) a retired Dutch professional footballer with over 400 club caps 
 Dorus de Vries (born 1980) a retired Dutch football goalkeeper with 431 club caps
 Laurien Hoos (born 1983) a Dutch heptathlete and hurdler, competed at the 2008 Summer Olympics
 Niki Terpstra (born 1984)  a Dutch racing cyclist
 Stefan Struve (born 1988), mixed martial artist
 Paul de Lange (born 1981) a retired Dutch footballer with nearly 400 club caps
 Arthur Numan (born 1969) a retired Dutch footballer with 436 club caps

Transport
Beverwijk railway station

Gallery

See also
 , Beverwijk

References

External links 

Official website

 
Municipalities of North Holland
Populated places in North Holland